William Corlett (8 October 1938 – 16 August 2005), was an English author, best known for his quartet of children's novels, The Magician's House, published between 1990 and 1992.

Biography
Corlett was born in Darlington, County Durham. He was educated at Fettes College, Edinburgh, then trained as an actor at the Royal Academy of Dramatic Art.

Later in life he came out as gay, and it was from his partner, Bryn Ellis, that he gained some of his inspiration for The Magician's House. Corlett died at Sarlat in France.

Bibliography

Plays
 Another Round (1963)
 The Gentle Avalanche (1964)
 Return Ticket (1966)

Teleplay
 "Barriers" (1980)
 "The Red Signal", "Through a Glass Darkly", "The Fourth Man", and "The Girl in the Train", (1982) from the "Agatha Christie Hour" teleseries

Novels
 The Gate of Eden (1974)
 The Land Beyond (1974)
 Return to the Gate (1975)
 The Dark Side of the Moon (1977)
 Bloxworth Blue (1984)
 The Steps Up the Chimney (1990)
 The Door in the Tree (1990)
 The Tunnel behind the Waterfall (1991)
 The Bridge in the Clouds (1992)
 The Summer of the Haunting (1993)
 The Secret Line (1995)
 Now and Then (1995)
 Two Gentlemen Sharing (1997)
 Kitty (2004)

Non-fiction
 The Hindu Sound (1978)
 The Christ Story (1978)
 The Islamic Space (1979)
 The Buddha Way (1980)
 The Judaic Law (1980)

References

External links
 Reviews of The Magician's House Quartet
 

1938 births
2005 deaths
English children's writers
English short story writers
English gay writers
People from Darlington
Deaths from cancer in France
British LGBT dramatists and playwrights
People educated at Fettes College
English LGBT novelists
British male dramatists and playwrights
English male short story writers
English male novelists
20th-century English novelists
20th-century English dramatists and playwrights
20th-century British short story writers
20th-century English male writers
20th-century English LGBT people